Lock & Lock is a household products company headquartered in Seoul, South Korea. Since its establishment in 1978, Lock & Lock has been exporting products to 119 countries worldwide

The company has a wide range of product categories for food containers, cookware, tumblers and water bottles.

In addition, the company has 11 overseas sales units including in Germany, United States, China, Vietnam, and 87 overseas directly operated stores in the world.

Campaigns

Love For Planet Campaign 
By recycling the collected airtight containers, 'upcycling eco-bag' was introduced to practice continuous resource circulation. Terracycle and Lock&Lock also collected and recycled tumblers to produce Jeju Olle-gil benches.Terracycle and Lock&Lock collaborate together to bring plastic airtight containers that are left unattended or old in the house to the store, and they will be given a coupon to purchase certain products at a discount.

Factories
Vũng Tàu, Vietnam (plastic/glass/cookware)
Manshan, Suzhou, China

History
 1978, established as Kukjin Distribution Corp. 
 1998, launched Lock & Lock four-sided locking food container 
 2003, changed the name of the company to Lock & Lock Co., Ltd
 2004, establishment of first overseas sales unit in China
 2008–2009, establishment of overseas sales units in Vietnam, Indonesia, Thailand
 2010, listing on the KOSPI market
 2010, establishment of overseas sales unit in Germany
 2011–2012, completion of glass and cookware production plants in Vietnam 
 2016, establishment of overseas sales unit in the United States

References

External links
Lock & Lock website

Chemical companies of South Korea
Companies based in Seoul
Manufacturing companies established in 1978
South Korean brands
Kitchenware brands
Plastic brands
Food storage
South Korean companies established in 1978
Companies listed on the Korea Exchange